Python europaeus is an extinct python species. It lived during the early/middle miocene. The holotype is a single trunk vertebra found in France.

References

europaeus
Miocene reptiles of Europe
Miocene lepidosaurs
Fossils of France